Worsley River is a river in the South West region of Western Australia.

The Worsley River was named after Charles Anderson-Pelham, Lord Worsley, patron  of the Western Australian Land and Emigration Committee, which included James Stirling, John Hutt, William Hutt (MP), Edward Barrett-Lennard  and Captain Bunbury.  The committee promoted emigration to the Swan River colony and the Western Australian Land Company, which established the Australind land settlement project in 1841 under Marshall Clifton. The name was first recorded in surveys performed in the area in 1845. 

The Worsley has no named tributaries.

References 

Rivers of the South West region